The 2015 Sochi GP3 Series round was a GP3 Series motor race held on October 10 and 11, 2015 at Sochi Autodrom, Russia. It was the seventh round of the 2015 GP3 Series. The race supported the 2015 Russian Grand Prix.

Classification

Qualifying

Feature Race

Sprint Race

See also 
 2015 Russian Grand Prix
 2015 Sochi GP2 Series round

References

External links
 

2015 GP3 round reports
GP3